The 1919–20 Scottish Cup was the 42nd staging of Scotland's most prestigious football knockout competition. The Cup was won by Kilmarnock who defeated Albion Rovers in the final.

Fourth round

Semi-finals

Replay

Second replay

Final

Teams

See also
1919–20 in Scottish football

References

1919-20
1919–20 domestic association football cups
Cup